Zebrasoma gemmatum, the gem tang, spotted tang or Mauritian tang, is a marine reef tang in the fish family Zebrasoma. Zebrasoma gemmatum is found in the Western Indian Ocean off the coast of Mozambique, South Africa and Madagascar and near the islands of Réunion and Mauritius. Z. gemmatum is a highly prized specimen by marine aquarists and often commands prices of $3000 or more.

References

External links
 Gem Tang (Zebrasoma gemmatum)
 

Acanthuridae
Fish described in 1835